Andrei Igorevich Bogdanov (born 7 October 1992) is a Russian luger. He competed in the men's doubles event at the 2018 Winter Olympics.

References

External links
 

1992 births
Living people
Russian male lugers
Olympic lugers of Russia
Lugers at the 2018 Winter Olympics
Lugers at the 2022 Winter Olympics
Place of birth missing (living people)
People from Dmitrovsky District, Moscow Oblast
Sportspeople from Moscow Oblast